Saint-Hilaire-de-Brens is a commune in the Isère department in southeastern France.

Population

Twin towns — sister cities
Saint-Hilaire-de-Brens is twinned with:

  Cornalba, Italy (1998)

See also
Communes of the Isère department

References

Communes of Isère
Isère communes articles needing translation from French Wikipedia